Hywel Thomas Bennett (8 April 1944 – 24 July 2017) was a Welsh film and television actor. He had a lead role in  The Family Way (1966) and played the titular "thinking man's layabout" James Shelley in the television sitcom Shelley (1979–1992).

Bennett played opposite Hayley Mills in The Family Way, Twisted Nerve (1968) and Endless Night (1972). Other notable film roles include Private Brigg in the comedy The Virgin Soldiers (1969), Dennis in Loot (1970) and Edwin Antony in Percy (1971). Bennett's character, Ricki Tarr, was pivotal in the BBC serial adaptation of John le Carré's Tinker, Tailor, Soldier, Spy (1979). In later years, he was often cast in villainous roles including Mr Croup in Neil Gaiman's Neverwhere (1996), Peter Baxter in ITV police drama The Bill (2002) and crime boss Jack Dalton in EastEnders (2003).

Early life
Bennett was born on 8 April 1944 in Garnant, Carmarthenshire, Wales, the son of Sarah Gwen (née Lewis) and Gorden Bennett. His first language was Welsh, but he learnt to speak English in an accent he called "London-Welsh" after the family moved to south London when he was four. He was the brother of actor Alun Lewis, who is best known for playing Vic Windsor in Emmerdale. Bennett attended Sunnyhill School, Streatham, Henry Thornton Grammar School, Clapham (1955–62) and the Royal Academy of Dramatic Art.

Career
Bennett debuted on stage in the role of Ophelia in a Queen's Theatre production of Hamlet in 1959. He continued with the company for five years, his roles including Richmond in Richard III at the Scala Theatre in 1963. After a brief period working as a supply teacher, Bennett won a scholarship to train at Royal Academy of Dramatic Art and performed in repertory in Salisbury and Leatherhead. He made his television debut in 1964, making early appearances in episodes of Doctor Who and Theatre 625. In 1966, he appeared as the lead Willy Turner in BBC1 Wednesday Play "Where the Buffalo Roam". This role as a mentally disturbed, cowboy-obsessed teenager was the first of many parts in Dennis Potter television plays.

His first film appearance was as Leonardo in the 1966 Italian Il marito è mio e l'ammazzo quando mi pare ("It's my husband and I'll decide when to kill him"), directed by Pasquale Festa Campanile, a comedy in which a young wife carefully plans to murder her husband, who is 40 years her senior, to marry a young beatnik. Bennett then starred as nervously virginal newlywed Arthur Fitton opposite Hayley Mills in the Boulting brothers' adaptation of Bill Naughton's play The Family Way (1966). He was cast after John Boulting saw him in the Alan Plater play A Smashing Day and felt he had "the appearance of both sensitivity and masculinity." The success of the film gained Bennett a contract with British Lion Films and led the News of the World to dub him "the face of '67". He considered his looks "a boon and a curse. It won me quick fame, but I was a serious actor being written up as a pin-up boy and sex symbol... ...I used to wish for a broken nose." He was reunited with Mills and the Boultings in the psychological thriller Twisted Nerve (1968), playing Martin Durnley in what the British Film Institute has described as "one of cinema's most striking depictions of evil". In 1969, he starred as Private Brigg in The Virgin Soldiers, a comedy-drama film set during the Malayan Emergency. Bennett described the film as "the story of a young soldier's love affair with a Chinese prostitute. And his fear in combat. One day he runs the wrong way and accidentally becomes a hero." In 1969, contemporary critic Roger Ebert called him "one of England's best young actors".

Bennett's film roles continued into the 1970s, notably with the film adaptation of Joe Orton's Loot (1970) and Endless Night (1972), an Agatha Christie adaptation again pairing him with Hayley Mills. He was the preferred choice for the role of Brian Roberts in Bob Fosse's Cabaret (1972), but wrongly assumed it was a singing role and didn't read the script. The part went to Michael York. He starred in the Ralph Thomas-directed sex comedies Percy (1971), in which he plays a shy young man who becomes the recipient of the world's first penis transplant, and The Love Ban (1973). Of this period in his career, Bennett would later state "I had come in at the tail end of everything, the studio system and so on. I found myself in the early 70s with nowhere to go."

He maintained a career in the theatre. His Puck in a 1967 Edinburgh Festival production of A Midsummer Night's Dream was described by Illustrated London News as "the best since Leslie French". He returned to the festival in 1990 as Long John Silver in a stage adaptation of Robert Louis Stevenson's Treasure Island. He appeared in several National Theatre productions including playing Mark Antony in Julius Caesar (the Young Vic, 1972) and Marlow in the She Stoops to Conquer (the Lyttelton Theatre, 1984). Other notable roles include Prince Hal in Henry IV, Parts 1 & 2 (the Mermaid Theatre, 1970), the lead in Hamlet on a 1974 South African tour and Andrey Prozorov in Three Sisters (the Albery Theatre, 1987). He also directed productions in provincial theatres, including a 1975 adaptation of J. B. Priestley's I Have Been Here Before at Theatr Gwynedd, Bangor.

Bennett's television career resumed with appearances in episodes of Play for Today (1973) and The Sweeney (1976). In 1978, he appeared in Dennis Potter's musical drama Pennies from Heaven as Tom, a pimp. In 1979, Bennett appeared as the field agent Ricki Tarr in Arthur Hopcraft's six-part BBC2 adaptation of John le Carré's novel Tinker, Tailor, Soldier, Spy (1979), playing the character with "an ever-thinning veneer of boyish charm masking years of self-delusion and betrayal" according to the BFI. Bennett then starred in two further BBC miniseries - Malice Aforethought (1979) and The Consultant (1981). In 1981, he played occult novelist Gideon Harlax in David Rudkin's television play Artemis 81.

In 1979 he took the lead role in the Thames Television sitcom Shelley (1979–84) as the titular "professional freelance layabout" James Shelley, a philosophical and sardonic geography graduate with no desire to work. The series, created by Peter Tilbury, drew audiences of up to 18 million viewers. According to Bennett, "the writers had done something pretty amazing. They had created what was almost a monologue and turned it into a popular sitcom." The programme resumed, initially under the title The Return of Shelley, in 1988 and continued until 1992.

During the 1980s, Bennett was the voice of British Rail in their advertisements featuring the slogan "We're getting there". He provided further voiceovers for Budweiser and Hoffmeister advertisements. In 1986, he played the investigative journalist Allan Blakeston in Paula Milne's single drama Frankie and Johnnie, a production he described as "one of the best things I've done in quite a long time". He lost weight to give the character a "hungry and haunted look". The following year, he played an architect whose reaction to urban violence is to steadily turn his suburban home into a virtual fortress in Andy Hamilton's black comedy Checkpoint Chiswick, part of the Tickets for the Titanic anthology series.

By the mid-1990s alcoholism and treatment for an overactive thyroid had altered Bennett's appearance. He was often cast in unsavoury roles including club owner Arthur 'Pig' Mallion in Dennis Potter's final, linked television plays Karaoke and Cold Lazarus (both 1996) and the villainous Mr Croup in Neil Gaiman's serial Neverwhere (1996). On film, he played in Dr. Crippen in Deadly Advice (1994) and Jean-Baptiste Colbert in Vatel (2000). He appeared in Lock, Stock... (2000) as Deep Throat and joined the cast of the long-running soap opera EastEnders in 2003, playing Jack Dalton – the ruthless gangland kingpin of Walford. Other late television appearances include ten appearances as sex offender Peter Baxter in The Bill (2002–2005) and as Dr. Mike Vine in the first episode of Jam & Jerusalem (2006). His final television role was opposite Peter Davison in an episode of The Last Detective (2007).

Personal life and death
In 1970 Bennett married Cathy McGowan, who had been the presenter of the music television programme Ready Steady Go! (1963–66). They had a daughter, Emma. The marriage was dissolved in 1988. In September 1986, Bennett sought treatment for alcoholism at the Priory Hospital, Roehampton. In 1998, he married Sandra Layne Fulford and they later moved to Deal, Kent. Bennett retired from acting in 2007 after being diagnosed with a congenital heart defect. He died on 24 July 2017 at the age of 73.

Filmography

Film

Television

Notes

References

External links
 Hywel Bennett at the British Film Institute
 
 HYWEL BENNETT

1944 births
2017 deaths
20th-century Welsh male actors
21st-century Welsh male actors
Welsh-speaking actors
Alumni of RADA
People from Garnant
Welsh male film actors
Welsh male soap opera actors
Welsh male television actors